The 2016 ASUN Conference men's soccer season was the 39th season of men's varsity soccer in the ASUN Conference, and also the first under the league's current "ASUN" branding.

The North Florida Ospreys are both the defending regular season and conference tournament champions.

Changes from 2015 

 The NJIT Highlanders joined the conference.

Teams

Stadia and locations

Personnel

Regular season

Results

Rankings

Postseason

A-Sun tournament

NCAA tournament

All-Atlantic Sun awards and teams

See also 
 2016 NCAA Division I men's soccer season
 2016 ASUN Men's Soccer Tournament
 2016 Atlantic Sun Conference women's soccer season

References 

 
2016 NCAA Division I men's soccer season